Castro's Bomb is an American alternate history ebook written by Robert Conroy. It was first published on Kindle on September 21, 2011.

Plot
In 1963, a year after the Cuban Missile Crisis, the leader of Cuba, Fidel Castro, and the Cuban Army use weapons left behind by the Soviet Union to seize the United States military base at Guantanamo Bay and then plan missile strikes against America. US President John F. Kennedy tries desperately to retain his leadership and to keep the war from escalating into World War III.

Reception
Castro's Bomb was a finalist for the 2012 Sidewise Award, Long Form. Blaine Pardoe considered it to have "huge gaps".

References

2011 American novels
American alternate history novels
Novels by Robert Conroy
Cultural depictions of Fidel Castro
Cultural depictions of John F. Kennedy